Masquerade - the Performance Group is a Chennai based English theatre group. It is one of the few theatre groups in Chennai that survive without commercial financial sponsorship or funding from business houses or the likes, backed by public faith and smaller donorships from patrons, parents of tweens and teens who pay for training workshops. Public performances are rarely priced and income from performances are invariably through hat collections, done consciously as a tool to gauge audience appreciation of the show.

Since 2000, the group has been extensively working with youth both at schools and through private workshops. Since 2009, through its youth & teen theatre initiative, Masquerade Youth Theatre (MYT), Masquerade has been conducting Camp Neuve, an  annual three week summer workshop that trains teens between ages 13 and 19 years. This leads to an eventual production featuring the workshop participants. Since 2009, through its The Bear and Beanbag Children's Theatre, the group has also been involved in presenting story performance sessions to tweens ages 7 to 11, and in conducting theatre and story telling workshops for children in conjunction with hobby centers and after-school experience centers in Chennai.

Company history

The early years

Masquerade - the Performance Group was conceived in 1993 and launched in June 1994. It debuted with its first performance of Hugo von Hofmannsthal's Elektra (English translation) at Sittrarangam, a little thatched-roof performance structure inside the Island Grounds that overlooks the War Memorial, near Anna Square.

Founded on the lawns of Max Mueller Bhavan (Chennai), at the Bhavan's Khader Nawaz Khan Road erstwhile premises, the group was a result of six individuals from various walks of society ranging from ballet dancing to accountancy, costume designing to teaching and research and their common passion towards live theatre art. In a city where English theatre happened originally among a few high-in-the-social ladder aficionado of theatre art then, Masquerade, in the company of a few of its ilk aspiring amateur English theatre youth groups, strove to erase an elitist view of English theatre in Chennai.

With inspirational support from the late Herr Klaus Schindler (then Director) and Herr Franz Xaver Augustin (then Language Dept Head) at Max Mueller Bhavan, Chennai, Masquerade's first theatre performance was an experimental adaptation of Austrian playwright Hugo von Hofmannsthal's Elektra. To further foster Masqerade's theatrical vigour, under their artists' support program, Masquerade's Artistic Director, Dr. S. Krishna Kumar, was sponsored to an internship at Oldenburg Staatstheater with ITI Berlin extending an artist stipend. In its early years, during the 1990s, many of Masquerade's productions were German plays performed in English. Besides Hofmannsthal's Elektra (1994), the group added Duerrenmatt's Romulus the Great (Ides of March 1995 production); Incident at Twilight by the same author (September 1994); and a retro trip through modern and contemporary German drama featuring seminal excerpts from Wedekind's Spring Awakening, Buechner's Leonce and Lena, Brecht's Arturo Ui and Botho Strauss's plays (June 1995), Buechner's Leonce and Lena (1997), Guenther Grass's The Plebeians Rehearse Their Uprising (1998) and The Broken Jug (Kleist) to its German-based repertoire.

In the year 1998, the group also produced Bertolt Brecht's two Lehrstuecke - The Measures Taken and He Who Said Yes, He Who Said No. The group predominantly worked on the lawns of Max Mueller Bhavan for its rehearsals during this period. Although the group produced several other works of drama literature from English playwrights, such as Confusions (Alan Ayckbourn) and The Ruffian on the Stair (Joe Orton), during this period, the influence of German literature and theatre is evident in its performance style. This had more to do with its Artistic and Creative Director, Dr. S. Krishna Kumar, who spent major periods of his training and learning in Magdeburg, Berlin and Oldenburg, Germany.

The evolution

Through the 1990s and the early part of the new millennium, the group had a staggering output of around 50 productions (200+ performances), story performances and performative story readings for children, a vast body of poetry readings in conjunction with the Culture Cafe - British Council, Chennai, and collaborations with virtually every local English and parallel Tamil theatre group. Masquerade's members had also exhaustively lent their hands in support to travelling domestic and international repertories in a technical as well as backstage capacity. In 2003, Masquerade hosted Curtain Raiser's Kandor (from Malta) featuring the duo of Patrick Vella and Claire Agius, who travelled to India from Edinburgh Fringe and performed in Chennai and Cochin.

At the turn of the century, the group had three very notable productions to its credit. Its 1999-2000 production of Alan Bennett's Kafka's Dick, 2000 production of David Mamet's Oleanna and Shakespeare's Twelfth Night (in collaboration with the India's oldest amateur English theatre group the Madras Players, 2002) underlined the group's status of an important English theatre group of the city.

The new millennium

Later in 2004, 10 years after Masquerade's inception, when the group decided to found Chennai's first youth theatre group Landing Stage, Electra was again the debut performance.

Masquerade has currently completed 23 seasons, 24 years and is stepping into its 25th year; with 100+ productions and more than 600 performances, the group intends to travel in new directions. The group has branched off into supporting the growth of teen and tween theatre activity in the city, with its Masquerade Youth Theatre (2009) and the Bear & Beanbag Children's Theater (2010). The group is striving to establish a niche performance space, catering exclusively for children's theatre in Chennai.

Masquerade was instrumental in setting up and promoting Natak, an inter-collegiate theatre festival. The first season of Natak was in 2000, which saw participants from various city colleges. The following year saw entries from colleges across India. Students were given the platform to design, plan and execute the entire production. Students were provided professional support by the Masquerade team in areas of light and sound design and execution, as well as with backstage support and planning. A stipend was paid to the teams to minimize the financial burden. A standard set of lights and sound equipment, paid for by Masquerade, was made available to the teams in designing their shows.

Natak gave the first platform for many of Chennai's emerging talent, several of whom were active performers on Chennai's stage as well as its famed film industry - Kollywood today. These included Abhinav Suresh (Crea-Shakthi), Nikhila Kesavan (the Madras Players), Aruna Ganeshram (Visual Respiration) and Andrea Jacob (actress). A majority of stage to screen acting talents of today's Tamil film industry have had a brush with Masquerade's theatre oeuvre at some point or other. These include Karthik Kumar (Evam), Karthik Srinivasan (TMK) (Sideways), Shankar Sundaram (the Madras Players), Paul Mathew, Yog Japee (theatre Y), Mathivanan Rajendran & Rajiv Rajaram (Stray Factory) and RJ/TV anchor Jagan. Some of its recent - MYT - products include Amitash Pradhan and Sanant Reddy who are starting to carve their own niche in the Kollywood (the Tamil) film industry. However, Masquerade strives to keep itself to purely live theatre performances.

Performances are social and community-oriented. Masquerade introduced "Three @ Twenty", a community theatre initiative to promote new writers, in 2006.

An important feature of the group's presence is its celebration of World Theatre Day on 27 March, each year. Since 2002, the group has celebrated the special day with a performance or hosting a production for another company or curating a festival, as they did in 2010 with "ACT 1", a festival of solo performances featuring some of the city's best performers across Tamil, English and Hindi theatre.

Selected productions

References

External links
 Official website
Dr. S. Krishna Kumar- Artistic Director, Masquerade, Chennai

Culture of Chennai
Theatre companies in India